Brooklyn Tabernacle is an evangelical non-denominational megachurch located at 17 Smith Street at the Fulton Mall in downtown Brooklyn, New York City. The senior pastor is Jim Cymbala.

History
The Brooklyn Tabernacle was originally established in 1847 as the Central Presbyterian Church, using the facilities of the First Presbyterian Church, at the corner of Willoughby Street and Pearl.  

In 1966, the church was renamed "Brooklyn Gospel Tabernacle" by the pastor Clair D. Hutchins.

By the time Pastor Jim and Carol Cymbala took over the church leadership in the autumn of 1971, the congregation had dwindled to only 40 people who met in a rundown building on Atlantic Avenue in Brooklyn.

In the 1980s, the Brooklyn Tabernacle purchased the former Carlton Theatre at 292 Flatbush Avenue at 7th Avenue, converting the 1383-seat theatre into a church. After many years of decline, the church was revitalized as a non-denominational congregation, and became well-known as the home of the Brooklyn Tabernacle Choir.

In 1984, the church took its current name "The Brooklyn Tabernacle".

The church remained in this location until 2002 when they moved into the former Loew's Metropolitan Theatre at 17 Smith Street. The sanctuary seats 3,300 people.

The Brooklyn Tabernacle Choir has received six Grammy Awards. It is directed by Carol Cymbala, the wife of the main Pastor, Jim Cymbala.

The Brooklyn Tabernacle Choir sang "The Battle Hymn of the Republic" at the 2013 second inauguration of Barack Obama.

The church has held three two-hour services weekly.

In 2017, the church had 10,000 members.

Building
The current building was completely redone by Kostow Greenwood Architects and Robert Silman Associates by gutting and renovating the old vaudeville theater for modern worship, and with state-of-the-art acoustics and recording equipment. Two adjacent buildings were converted into offices, classrooms, community service areas, and dining facilities.

See also
List of the largest evangelical churches
List of the largest evangelical church auditoriums
Worship service (evangelicalism)

References

External links

Churches in Brooklyn
Downtown Brooklyn
Evangelical megachurches in the United States
Loew's Theatres buildings and structures
Megachurches in New York (state)
Nondenominational Christianity